Ruby Waters (born July 20, 1997) is a Canadian singer-songwriter.

Of Métis and Slovak heritage, Waters grew up in Shelburne, Ontario. She first attracted attention when a video of her performing her debut single "Sweet Sublime" became popular on Reddit. She followed up with the singles "Supernatural" and "Last Cigarette", and toured as an opening act for City and Colour on his 2019 tour, before releasing her debut EP Almost Naked.

She released her second EP, If It Comes Down to It, in 2020. In the same year she was featured on "Jungle", a track by rapper DillanPonders.

Her single "Blow" was released in 2021, and was named the 29th best Canadian song of the year in CBC Music's year-end charts for 2021. She performed in October 2021 at the Osheaga Festival's "Get Together" edition.

She received a Juno Award nomination for Alternative Album of the Year at the Juno Awards of 2022 for If It Comes Down to It.

References

1997 births
Living people
21st-century Canadian women singers
Canadian women singer-songwriters
Canadian women rock singers
Canadian women pop singers
Musicians from Ontario
Métis musicians
People from Dufferin County